The River Niger is a play by Joseph A. Walker, first performed by New York City's Negro Ensemble Company off-Broadway in 1972. The production made its Broadway debut with a transfer to the Brooks Atkinson Theatre on 27 March 1973 for a run of 162 performances. It's a black play, meaning all characters are African American, with the titular river being a pun on the N-word.

Characters 
 Mattie Williams
 Johnny Williams
 Dr. Dudley Stanton
 Jeff Williams
 Ann Vanderguild
 Big Moe Hayes
 Al
 Chips
 Skeeter
 Gail
 Wilhelmina Brown

Adaptations

The play was adapted by Walker for film in 1976, directed by Krishna Shah starring Cicely Tyson and James Earl Jones.

Awards and nominations
Awards
 1973 Drama Desk Award for Most Promising Playwright – Joseph A. Walker
 1973 Obie Award for Best American Play
 1974 Tony Award for Best Play

Nominations
 1974 Tony Award for Best Featured Actor in a Play – Douglas Turner Ward
 1974 Tony Award for Best Featured Actress in a Play – Roxie Roker

External links
  The River Niger play
 Original Off-Broadway Production
  Original Broadway Production
 

1973 plays
All-Black cast Broadway shows
Broadway plays
Drama Desk Award-winning plays
Obie Award-winning plays
Off-Broadway plays
Tony Award-winning plays
African-American plays
American plays adapted into films
African-American culture